Ayourou (or Ayorou or Ayerou) is a town and rural commune in the Tillabéri Region, in western Niger. It is situated 208 km northwest of the capital Niamey near the Malian border. The old town stands on an eponymous island in the River Niger.  It is known for its animal market and for wildlife including hippopotamuses and birds.

References

External links 

Populated places in Niger